Nasib Arida (1887–1946) was a Syrian-born poet and writer of the Mahjar movement and a founding member of the New York Pen League.

Life
Arida was born in Homs to a Syrian Greek Orthodox family where he received his education until his immigration to the United States in 1905. In New York City, Arida started working in retail and writing for Al-Hoda and Meraat-ul-Gharb. Arida later married Najeeba Haddad, the sister of fellow Homs-born writers Abd al-Masih Haddad and Nadra Haddad; the couple would not have children, but would raise the daughter of another Haddad brother after the latter's wife's death in childbirth.

In 1913, Arida founded Al-Funoon, which was "the first attempt at an exclusively literary and artistic magazine by the Arab immigrant community in New York." In 1915 or 1916 along with Abd al-Masih Haddad he co-founded the Pen League in New York, an Arabic-language literary society, later joined by Kahlil Gibran, Mikha'il Na'ima and other Mahjari poets in 1920. He had one collection of poems, Perplexed Spirits, published in 1946. He died the same year.

Similar to other Syro-Lebanese writers and intellectuals of his time, Arida opposed the Ottoman rule on Syria and repression of Syrian nationalism. He lamented that the Syrian people were slow to act or protest, as in the following poem:

References

Sources

External links
 Website devoted to Al-Funoon (Nasib Aridah Organization)

Syrian poets
Syrian Christians
1887 births
1946 deaths
People from Homs
American people of Syrian descent
20th-century poets
20th-century American male writers
20th-century Syrian people
20th-century American people
Mahjar
Syrian magazine founders
Emigrants from the Ottoman Empire to the United States